The Miles & Atwood Special is a racing aircraft developed during the interwar period

Development
The Miles & Atwood Special is a single seat, low-wing, open cockpit, racing aircraft with conventional landing gear. It was built by Leon Atwood and Lee Miles.

The aircraft uses solid wood spars. Fabric was attached using a relatively new process using screws with fabric tape covering, rather than conventional rib-stitching. The aircraft raced with a green livery waxed to a high gloss. Lee Miles died when a flying wire broke in a 1937 qualifying race.

Operational history
Won 1933 Greve Trophy
In February 1934, the Miles & Atwood Special won the Shell Trophy
Sixth place in 1935 Greve race

Specifications (Miles & Atwood Special)

References

Further reading
Brown B-2 Racer, a follow-on aircraft by the same designer.

External links

Racing aircraft
Low-wing aircraft
Single-engined tractor aircraft